Horodnia (also Gorodnya, Horodnya, Horodnye, or Gorodnye) was a flight training air base in Ukraine located 4 km east of Horodnia.

It was home to the 703rd Training Aviation Regiment flying 101 Aero L-39 Albatros, "C" model. The 703rd Training Aviation Regiment moved from Uman to Gorodnya in 1965; it formed part of the Chernigov Higher Military Aviation School of Pilots. The regiment was taken over by Ukraine in early 1992.

As of January, 2020, it is reported as "abandoned" on www.openstreetmap.org.

References

RussianAirFields.com

Soviet Air Force bases
Ukrainian airbases
Military installations established in the 1960s